Solomon Laurent Juneau, or Laurent-Salomon Juneau (August 9, 1793 – November 14, 1856) was a French Canadian fur trader, land speculator, and politician who helped found the city of Milwaukee, Wisconsin. He was born in Repentigny, Quebec, Canada to François and (Marie-)Thérèse Galarneau Juneau. His cousin was Joseph Juneau, who founded the city of Juneau, Alaska.

Biography
After landing at Fort Michilimackinac in 1816, Juneau worked as a clerk in the fur trade before becoming an agent for the American Fur Company in Milwaukee. He had been summoned to the Milwaukee area by Jacques Vieau, a French-Canadian fur trader and the first permanent white settler in Milwaukee, Wisconsin. In 1818 Jacques Vieau hired Solomon Juneau, based on the accounting prowess Juneau had become known for, and Juneau's reputation for being able to deal well with the local native Americans. Juneau later married one of Vieau's daughters, Josette, and went on to found what was to become the City of Milwaukee.

Juneau settled an area east of the Milwaukee River called Juneautown (present-day East Town) in 1818, which later joined with George H. Walker's Walker's Point and Byron Kilbourn's Kilbourntown (present-day Westown) to incorporate the City of Milwaukee. With Juneau came his personal cook Joe Oliver, a Black Catholic believed to have been the first African American in Milwaukee history.

In 1831, Juneau began learning English and set in motion the naturalization and citizenship process. By 1835, he was selling plots of land in Juneautown. He built Milwaukee's first store and first inn, and was recognized for his leadership among newcomers to Milwaukee. In 1837 he started the Milwaukee Sentinel, which would become the oldest continuously operating business in Wisconsin. He was the first mayor of Milwaukee from 1846 until 1847, and was appointed its first Postmaster. Solomon Juneau High School, built in 1932, is named after him. The school is located at 6415 West Mount Vernon Avenue in Milwaukee.  The hour bell in the clock tower of the Milwaukee City Hall, installed in 1896, is also named after him.

Personal
In 1820, Juneau married Josette, the Métis daughter of Jacques Vieau, a fur trader who had built a trading post overlooking the Menomonee Valley years before, and his Menominee wife. Josette was the oldest of 12 children, and was Menominee and French by ancestry. Through her alliances to the tribe, and the relationships fostered through Juneau's business in fur trading, it is reported that he was popular with the Menominee. After the treaty of 1848 between the United States and the Menominee, Juneau registered his wife and children as half-breeds of the  Menominee Nation.

In 1854, Juneau and family relocated to Dodge County, Wisconsin, where they founded the village of Theresa, named after Juneau's French-Canadian mother. Josette died there in 1855; Solomon died one year later in Keshena, Wisconsin, on a visit to the Menominee tribe. He died in the arms of Benjamin Hunkins, his "faithful friend and constant nurse." Six Menominee chiefs served as pallbearers at his funeral. He is buried at Calvary Cemetery, Milwaukee, Wisconsin. 

Juneau's grandson Paul O. Husting would be elected as a member of the United States Senate. The property that is believed to have once been the site of Juneau's residence is now the site of the Mitchell Building, listed on the National Register of Historic Places.

See also
 SS Solomon Juneau
 Juneau Monument
 Solomon Juneau Business High School

References

Further reading
 
 
 Obituary. Milwaukee Sentinel. 28 January 1858.

External links
 
 Wisconsin Historical Society
 Josette and Solomon Juneau
 Urban spelunking: Solomon Juneau's cabin

1793 births
1856 deaths
Pre-Confederation Canadian emigrants to the United States
American real estate businesspeople
American people of Québécois descent
Mayors of Milwaukee
Wisconsin postmasters
People from Repentigny, Quebec
American city founders
Articles containing video clips
19th-century American newspaper founders
19th-century American politicians
Solomon